Jebb Sinclair (born 4 August 1986) is a Canadian rugby union player who played most recently for London Irish. Released from his contract over the summer of 2017, he is now coaching in Canada.

Sinclair is a flanker but can also provide cover in the second row. Jebb made his debut for the Canadian national rugby team against Portugal while on Canada's 2008 tour of Europe.

Sinclair has previously played with the Fredericton Loyalists, Castaway Wanderers RFC, RGC 1404 in North Wales, and The Rock of the Canadian Rugby Championship.

On July 8, 2011 Rugby Canada released its 30-man squad for the 2011 Rugby World Cup which included Sinclair. The 2011 event was Sinclair's first World Cup.

Sinclair became the second Canadian international to win the Currie Cup following dual South African and Canadian international Christian Stewart. Both Sinclair and Stewart achieved this in the colours of Western Province.

References

1986 births
Canadian expatriate rugby union players
Canadian expatriate sportspeople in England
Canadian expatriate sportspeople in South Africa
Canada international rugby union players
Canadian rugby union coaches
Canadian rugby union players
Expatriate rugby union players in England
Expatriate rugby union players in South Africa
Living people
Rugby union flankers
Rugby union number eights
Sportspeople from Red Deer, Alberta
Stormers players
London Irish players
Western Province (rugby union) players
Canada international rugby sevens players